James Gilbert Anderson (born 1944) is the Philip S. Weld Professor of Atmospheric Chemistry at Harvard University, a position he has held since 1982. From 1998 to 2001, he was the chairman of Harvard's Department of Chemistry and Chemical Biology. He is a fellow of the American Association for the Advancement of Science, the American Academy of Arts and Sciences, the American Geophysical Union, the National Academy of Sciences, and the American Philosophical Society. His awards include the 1993 Ernest Orlando Lawrence Award, the 1996 Arthur L. Day Prize and Lectureship and the 2021 Dreyfus Prize in the Chemical Sciences. In 2012, Anderson won a Smithsonian magazine American Ingenuity Award in Physical Sciences.
Anderson is currently working on the development of a solar powered aircraft for climate science and atmospheric observation.

References

External links
Harvard faculty page

Living people
1944 births
Atmospheric chemists
John A. Paulson School of Engineering and Applied Sciences faculty
University of Washington alumni
University of Colorado alumni
Fellows of the American Association for the Advancement of Science
Fellows of the American Geophysical Union
People from Spokane, Washington
Fellows of the American Academy of Arts and Sciences

Members of the American Philosophical Society